Wirral Transport Museum is a museum situated approximately  from the Mersey Ferry service at Woodside, Birkenhead, England.

A vintage tram service links the museum and the ferry at certain times. Admission into the museum is free with a broad selection of vintage and classic vehicles, including trams, buses, cars, motorcycles, mopeds, bikes, and a fire engine. It also includes views of ongoing projects in the museum's workshops, a 26 feet long model railway layout, a reconstructed 1930s garage scene and various other transport-related static exhibits.

History
The museum was established in 1995 as the tram shed for the Wirral Tramway. In 2009, as part of its Strategic Asset Review, owners Wirral Borough Council planned to dispose of the museum, transferring it to a Community Development Trust. It recommended that "... the specialist role of the Transport Museum be protected as far as possible." By 2014, the council was in discussions to hand over management of the museum to a volunteer organisation. The museum volunteers and its staff look forward to developing the museum further.

In 2011, the museum welcomed comedian Ken Dodd, who took a ride on one of the trams for a BBC documentary.

Owenership of the museum was transferred in March 2023 from Wirral Council to Big Heritage, a non-profit company that also runs the Western Approaches Museum and two visitor attractions in Chester. The council revealed that it cost £85,000 a year to run the museum, which attracts around 6,000 visitors per year. Big Heritage were granted a 25-year lease and hope to increase visitor numbers to 40,000 a year.

Trams

The tramway collection was set up in collaboration with volunteers from Merseyside Tramway Preservation Society.
The Wirral Tramway commenced service in April 1995 with the Hong Kong-built, 1948-style units. Operated under contract by Blackpool Tramways for Wirral Borough Council, who took overall control in 2005.

Hong Kong tramcar 69, which bears the name of George Francis Train & Phileas Fogg, received a new 'Prenton style' livery in 2005. Hong Kong tramcar 70, named Thomas Brassey after the well known 19th century railroad builder, has been painted in a fictional 'Birkenhead Blue' livery (which was only ever carried by the town's bus fleet after 1934).

Liverpool 245, a Baby Grand owned by National Museums Liverpool but kept at Birkenhead since 2006, was restored to operational use by the Merseyside Tramway Preservation Society. This was funded with the help of a £50,000 lottery heritage fund grant in 2010, with completion of the restoration in 2014.

Other operational trams of the fleet include Birkenhead 20, Wallasey 78, Liverpool 762 and Lisbon 730. Meanwhile, horse-drawn tram Liverpool 43 is on display within the museum.

Buses

The Technical Custodian held a National / Standard (2) Operator Licence. On his retirement in January 2014 the entitlement for the museum to use vehicles on a hire and reward basis ceased.

Birkenhead Corporation
BG 8557, a 1943 Guy Arab (324) rebodied in 1953 (242).  Now restored with help from Paul Anderson / Home front funding, 1BG Project
BG 9225, a 1946 Leyland Titan PD1/1a (No. 105). Restored with support of Ovaltine and match funding, 1BG Project.
RCM 493, a 1964 Leyland Leopard L1 (No. 93). Restored by Wirral Museum / Hamilton Quarter funding.
GCM 152E, a 1967 Leyland Titan PD2/37 (No. 152). Restored with Hamilton Quarter funding, Wirral Museums / 201 & 1BG Project.

Wallasey Corporation
AHF 850, a 1951 Leyland Titan PD2/1 (No. 54). Preserver Cedric Greenwood (1973). Funding purchased New Wallasey, 1BG Project.
CHF 565, a 1954 Leyland Titan PD2/10 (No. 106). Preserver Mayers. Restoration funding from New Wallasey, Wirral Museums 201 project.

Crosville Motor Services
319 PFM, a 1960 Bristol Lodekka / ECW FS6G Preserved by 1BG / N Moore / Wirral Museums (2007)
DVG 487, a 1981 Bristol VR / ECW Crosville is also resident at the museum (2010)
B200 DTU, a 1985 Leyland Olympian/ECW

Other waiting projects
Crosville MS18 1949 Bedford Beagle. Converted Mobile Office a 1BG Project funding needed.
HKF 820, a 1949 AEC Regent III, Liverpool A344. Preservers Bill Barlow / David Forrest. Transferred to Wirral Transport Museum in 2006.

Former vehicles displayed
101 CLT, a London AEC Routemaster (RM 1101). Purchased in 1994 via A1A Travel and restored with Hamilton Quarter funding. Withdrawn in April 2009, and is now to be found operating back on London streets with theghostbustours.com. RM1101 has reverted to its KFF 367 registration.
THM 692M, a London Transport Daimler Fleetline (DMS 1692), MCW bodywork. Purchased by Wirral Local Education Authority in 1998, it was previously used as a mobile classroom. Withdrawn in April 2009. Now to be found operating as a mobile church/youth club at Ellesmere Port, Cheshire.
OFM 957K, a Daimler Fleetline, Chester City 75 Open Top ex 54. Sold to the North West Museum of Road Transport in January 2009.
F362 WSC, a Leyland Olympian, Alexander 81 seat bodywork. Operational since March 2009, the vehicle was re-registered as 101 CLT on 25 April 2009. Number previously donated back to RM 1101. This vehicle replaced the Millennium bus (DMS 1692). In April 2012 It was re-registered F362 WSC and the bus placed into preservation with a Yorkshire group. Routemaster Registration 101 CLT (from RM1101 now KFF 367), was exchanged for Ribble PD3 1841 registration TCK 841 and in line with museum policy its classic bus fleet continue to display their original registrations.

Static and other exhibits

Numerous static or semi-static exhibits are on display at the museum. These include an example model of one of the cranes at the former Bidston Dock, model buses, model trams and a model of the former Mersey ferry SS Thurstaston.

Several vintage cars, including an Austin 1800 dating to 1970, an Austin 7, a Morris Minor Traveller, a Triumph Dolomite 1300 and a 1946 Wolseley 14-series police car are on display.

Also on display are various vintage motorcycles, including a BSA Bantam, a Douglas, a 1956 BSA C10L, a 1938 Norton 16H and a 1964 Honda CB92. Meanwhile, mopeds on display include a Yamaha QT50 and a 1967 Honda P50.

See also
Wirral Tramway
Birkenhead Transport
Birkenhead Dock Branch

References

External links

 Merseyside Tramway Preservation Society - operates the museum

Buildings and structures in Birkenhead
Bus museums in England
Museums in Merseyside
Tram transport in England
Tramways with double-decker trams
Transport museums in England
Transport in the Metropolitan Borough of Wirral